This article shows the roster of all participating teams at the 2020 Summer Olympics.

Pool A

Brazil
The roster was announced on 26 June 2021.

Head coach: José Roberto Guimarães

2 Carol Gattaz 
7 Rosamaria Montibeller 
8 Macris Carneiro 
9 Roberta Ratzke 
10 Gabriela Guimarães 
11 Tandara Caixeta 
12 Natália Pereira (c) 
15 Ana Carolina da Silva 
16 Fernanda Garay 
17 Ana Cristina de Souza 
18 Camila Brait 
20 Ana Beatriz Corrêa

Dominican Republic
The roster was announced on 10 July 2021.

Head coach:  Marcos Kwiek

1 Annerys Vargas 
3 Lisvel Elisa Eve 
5 Brenda Castillo 
6 Camil Domínguez 
7 Niverka Marte 
14 Prisilla Rivera (c) 
16 Yonkaira Peña 
18 Bethania de la Cruz 
20 Brayelin Martínez 
21 Jineiry Martínez 
23 Gaila González 
25 Larysmer Martínez

Japan
The roster was announced 30 June 2021.

Head coach: Kumi Nakada

1 Ai Kurogo 
2 Sarina Koga 
3 Kanami Tashiro 
4 Mayu Ishikawa 
5 Haruyo Shimamura 
6 Mako Kobata 
8 Yuki Ishii 
9 Mai Okumura 
11 Erika Araki (c) 
12 Aki Momii 
15 Kotona Hayashi 
19 Nichika Yamada

Kenya
The roster was announced on 26 June 2021.

Head coach:  Luizomar de Moura

1 Jane Wacu 
4 Leonida Kasaya 
5 Sharon Chepchumba 
8 Joy Lusenaka 
10 Noel Murambi 
12 Gladys Ekaru 
13 Lorine Chebet 
14 Mercy Moim (C)
15 Pamela Jepkirui 
16 Agripina Kundu 
18 Emmaculate Chemtai 
19 Edith Mukuvilani

Serbia
The following is the Serbian roster.

Head coach: Zoran Terzić

1 Bianka Buša 
5 Mina Popović 
8 Slađana Mirković 
9 Brankica Mihajlović 
10 Maja Ognjenović (c) 
13 Ana Bjelica 
14 Maja Aleksić 
16 Milena Rašić 
17 Silvija Popović 
18 Tijana Bošković 
19 Bojana Milenković 
20 Jelena Blagojević

South Korea
The roster was announced on 4 July 2021.

Head coach:  Stefano Lavarini

1 Lee So-young 
3 Yeum Hye-seon 
4 Kim Hee-jin 
7 An Hye-jin 
8 Park Eun-jin 
9 Oh Ji-young 
10 Kim Yeon-koung (c) 
11 Kim Su-ji 
13 Park Jeong-ah 
14 Yang Hyo-jin 
16 Jeong Ji-yun 
19 Pyo Seung-ju

Pool B

Argentina
The roster was announced 26 June 2021.

Head coach: Hernán Ferraro

1 Elina Rodríguez 
2 Sabrina Germanier 
3 Yamila Nizetich 
4 Daniela Bulaich 
6 Eugenia Nosach 
11 Julieta Lazcano (c) 
12 Tatiana Rizzo 
13 Bianca Farriol 
14 Victoria Mayer 
15 Antonela Fortuna 
16 Erika Mercado 
17 Candelaria Herrera

China
The following is the Chinese roster.

Head coach: Lang Ping

 1 Yuan Xinyue 
 2 Zhu Ting (c) 
 6 Gong Xiangyu 
 7 Wang Yuanyuan 
 9 Zhang Changning 
 10 Liu Xiaotong 
 11 Yao Di 
 12 Li Yingying 
 16 Ding Xia 
 17 Yan Ni 
 18 Wang Mengjie 
 19 Liu Yanhan

Italy
The roster was announced on 5 July 2021.

Head coach: Davide Mazzanti

1 Indre Sorokaite 
5 Ofelia Malinov 
6 Monica De Gennaro 
7 Raphaela Folie 
8 Alessia Orro 
9 Caterina Bosetti 
10 Cristina Chirichella 
11 Anna Danesi 
13 Sarah Fahr 
14 Elena Pietrini 
17 Miriam Sylla 
18 Paola Egonu

ROC
The roster was announced on 1 July 2021.

Head coach:  Sergio Busato

4 Daria Pilipenko 
5 Polina Matveeva 
6 Irina Koroleva 
8 Natalia Goncharova 
10 Arina Fedorovtseva 
12 Anna Lazareva 
13 Yevgeniya Startseva 
14 Irina Fetisova 
16 Irina Voronkova 
19 Anna Podkopaeva 
25 Ksenia Smirnova 
26 Ekaterina Enina

Turkey
The roster was announced on 7 July 2021.

Head coach:  Giovanni Guidetti

2 Simge Aköz 
3 Cansu Özbay 
4 Tuğba Şenoğlu 
5 Şeyma Ercan 
6 Kübra Akman 
7 Hande Baladın 
9 Meliha İsmailoğlu 
11 Naz Aydemir 
13 Meryem Boz 
14 Eda Erdem Dündar 
18 Zehra Güneş 
99 Ebrar Karakurt

United States
The roster was announced on 7 June 2021.

Head coach: Karch Kiraly

1 Micha Hancock 
2 Jordyn Poulter 
4 Justine Wong-Orantes 
10 Jordan Larson (c) 
11 Annie Drews 
12 Jordan Thompson 
14 Michelle Bartsch-Hackley 
15 Kim Hill 
16 Foluke Akinradewo 
22 Haleigh Washington 
23 Kelsey Robinson 
24 Chiaka Ogbogu

References

Women's team rosters
Volleyball women
2020